Charaxes affinis is a butterfly in the family Nymphalidae. It was described by Arthur Gardiner Butler in 1866. It is found in the Indomalayan realm.

Description
Charaxes affinis is a large, sexually dimorphic butterfly (wingspan 66-75mm).The upperside of the male is orange-brown with a broad dark brown or black marginal band on the forewings, and a submarginal line of brown or black spots and a small tail on the hindwings. Its patterns and colours are extremely variable.

Technical description

The body of both male and female charaxes affinis, especially the thorax, are less bright tawny orange than the wings, more ochre-coloured. Males' wings are bright tawny orange, with a largely buff-coloured abdominal fold. Forewings are rather falcate, outer edge either nearly entire, or denticulate ; posterior half or two-thirds of bar D obsolete ; median bars SC5-R2 heavy, forming generally triangular patches which are more or less fused with the black outer area, but the second stands sometimes quite isolated, median bar R3-M1 seldom clearly marked above, about (6mm. distant from origin of M1 (as on underside) ; black postdiscal-marginal area much narrower behind than in front, measuring about 4 mm. at SM2 ; discal bar M2-SM2 present, either heavy and separated from black border of the wing by a small tawny orange spot between veins, or feeble and then more or less completely isolated (in all specimens from North Celebes ?), bar M1-M2 stands also often partly separated from the black border. These discal bars much more distal than the discal bars of the underside ; edge of wing has two minute tawny dots between M2 and SM2 in the greater number of individuals ; fringe white between veins. Hindwing somewhat variable in shape. The anal angle more prominent in some specimens than in others ; median bar (C -SC2 seldom absent, in some specimens
also bar SC2—R1 marked ; postdiscal-submarginal patches C-R1 large, the others small, patch SC2-R1 at least 6 mm. long, the black scaling extending. In many specimens along SC- basad for several millimetres, all the other patches separated from one another ; white submarginal dots within those patches are variable, often partly absent ; admarginal line black, sharply marked, separated from edge of wing, posteriorly between the veins where it is generally thin, from
(C to R3 it is generally heavy, dilated along the veins and joined to, or partly fused with, the postdisco-submarginal patches ; upper tail acute, 3 to 4 mm. long, second very short, sometimes not so much prominent as the teeth SC2—R2.
Underside : varying from ochraceous to ochre yellow, the glossy parts appearing darker (slaty grey) in side light, the discal interspaces lighter at the median bars,all the bars much thinner than in latona. Forewing : submedian bar M1-M2 rather oblique, bar M2-(SM1) about midway between base of M2 and bar M1-M2 often also oblique, bar R3- M1 always about (in both sexes) ; discal bars more distal than in latona, less arched, the series not interrupted at R2 ; postdiscal patches very obscurely marked, with ill-defined, white patches at their distal side, of which the middle ones are mostly very feeble ; upper cell-bar curved twice, the middle portion pointing distad, basal cell-spot at least vestigial, costal margin somewhat greyish at base.

Hindwing : median series of bars much broken, none of the bars contiguous, bar R3-M1 several millimetres distant from base of M1, not standing very far from the discal series, bar R-—R^ much more distal than bar R2-R3, the discal interspace, therefore, not half the width between R2 and M1 as between C and R2; discal bars much less arched than in latona, the posterior ones almost straight, the series not parallel to outer margin of wing, it being slightly curved basad from
C-R3 and then running nearly straight to SM3, which it reaches close to anal angle ; postdiscal bars indistinct, represented by blackish, ill-defined, feebly curved lunules, interspace between them and the discal bars tawny outwardly, more yellow proximally; admarginal blackish brown line thin, but well-defined, not touching edge of wing, sometimes interrupted at veins.

Females are often confounded with the female of latona.
Wings, upperside. Forewing : outer margin more concave than in latona ; median bars SC5-R2 less enlarged than in latona, somewhat more distal ; discal luniform bars more distal than in latona and also much more distal than the discal bars of the underside, which show through, the upper ones more or less enlarged ; postdisco-submarginal patches more triangular than in latona, closer to edge of wing, often fused with the black-brown margin ; marginal line much thinner than in latona, very indistinctly defined, the pale tawny orange colour extending close to the fringe at the veins. Hindwing : median bars C-SC2 always (?), SC2-R1 mostly
present, bar R1-R2 seldom distinctly marked, disc outside these bars often very pale ; discal lunules shining through from below ; there is often a very indistinct, band-like, dark shade from the inner edge of the upper postdisco-submarginal patches straight to anal angle, corresponding to the black postdiscal band of the underside, this shadowy band sometimes ending in a conspicuous blackish half-moon at anal angle ; postdisco-submarginal patches closer to margin than in latona, the posterior ones always small, the middle and upper white submarginal dots seldom obliterated; admarginal line thin, but well-defined, broken up into slightly arched lunules, the
upper ones heavier ; upper tail spatulate, 7 mm. long, second a very short and blunt tooth.
Underside : discal interspaces of both wings, the greater part of the postdiscal and submedian interspaces of the forewing ochre yellow, median interspace of both wings more or less brown ; bars thinner than in latona. Forewing : submedian bar M1-M2 always considerably more distal than submedian bar M2-(SM1), and median bar R3-M1 much more so than median bar M1-M2 ; discal luniform bars less deeply arched than in latona, more distal in position ; postdisco-submarginal spots much shaded with white scales, consisting generally of a blackish proximal
(postdiscal; dot or dash which is separated from a similar, but less obvious, spot by whitish scales; from the postdiscal dots extend basad fine, yellow, lines situated at the internervular folds R2-SM2, these lines sometimes very faint. Hindwing:discal interspace very much narrowed between R2 and M1, the median bars R2-M1 not far from the discal series, especially bar R3-M1 ; discal bars luniform, the posterior ones very feebly arched, the series very slightly convex from SC2-M1, reaching SM2 much nearer tip of that vein than in latona : postdiscal bars slateblack,
much less arched than in latona, the series almost straight.
Length of forewing : male 38–44 mm.,
female 50–53 mm.

Subspecies
Charaxes affinis affinis (Sulawesi, Togian)
Charaxes affinis butongensis Tsukada, 1991 (Buton, Kabaena) 
Charaxes affinis spadix Tsukada, 1991 (Banggai)

Biology
The larva on feeds on Manihot species and Persea americana.

References

External links
Charaxes Ochsenheimer, 1816 at Markku Savela's Lepidoptera and Some Other Life Forms

affinis
Butterflies described in 1866
Butterflies of Asia
Taxa named by Arthur Gardiner Butler